Pull My Daisy is a 1959 American short film directed by Robert Frank and Alfred Leslie, and adapted by Jack Kerouac from the third act of his play, Beat Generation.

Kerouac also provided improvised narration. It features poets Allen Ginsberg, Peter Orlovsky and Gregory Corso, artists Larry Rivers and Alice Neel, musician David Amram, art dealer Richard Bellamy, Delphine Seyrig, dancer Sally Gross, and Pablo Frank, Robert Frank's son.

Plot

Cast

Production 
Based on an incident in the life of Beat icon Neal Cassady and his wife, the painter Carolyn, the film tells the story of a railway brakeman whose wife invites a respected bishop over for dinner. However, the brakeman's bohemian friends crash the party, with comic results.

Originally intended to be called The Beat Generation, the title Pull My Daisy was taken from the poem of the same name written by Kerouac, Ginsberg, and Cassady in the late 1940s. Part of the original poem was used as a lyric in Amram's jazz composition that opens the film.

The Beat philosophy emphasized spontaneity, and the film conveyed the quality of having been thrown together or even improvised. Pull My Daisy was accordingly praised for years as an improvisational masterpiece.  It was filmed in Alfred Leslie's loft at Fourth Ave. & 12th St. in Manhattan.

Leslie and Frank discuss the film at length in Jack Sargeant's book Naked Lens: Beat Cinema. An illustrated transcript of the film's narration was also published in 1961 by Grove Press.

Reception
Pull My Daisy was selected for preservation in the United States National Film Registry by the Library of Congress in 1996, as being "culturally, historically, or aesthetically significant".

See also
 List of American films of 1959
 List of avant-garde films of the 1950s

References

External links
 
 Pull My Daisy  on YouTube

Films about the Beat Generation
American avant-garde and experimental films
1959 films
United States National Film Registry films
1950s avant-garde and experimental films
American films based on plays
1950s English-language films
1950s American films